Martim is a Portuguese parish, located in the municipality of Barcelos. The population in 2011 was 2,375, in an area of 5.32 km².

References

Freguesias of Barcelos, Portugal